Siccia obscura is a moth of the subfamily Arctiinae first described by John Henry Leech in 1888. It is found in Japan.

References

Lithosiini